Linkbelt Oval is a sports stadium on the island nation of Nauru.  It is located in Aiwo and was constructed by the Nauru Phosphate Corporation. It is also called the Aida Oval, because Aida, one of the athletic organizations in Nauru, holds its competitions and trainings here. 1,000-capacity Denig Stadium, which hosted home games of association football club Black Brothers, and Linkbelt Oval are the main sports venues on Nauru.

Overview

Because of its age and rough playing surface, it is generally not suitable for international requirements.  The Linkbelt Oval  hosts Australian rules football and soccer matches.  The stadium holds the offices of the Nauru Australian Football Association (NAFA), which organized the games of the national championships and the national team.  The visitor attendance record lies at 3,000 spectators, which was achieved during the championship finale in 1999.

It consists of a playing field and temporary small grandstands during important games.  The structure is named after a company, which was earlier involved in the excavation of phosphates.  Additionally, the team named after the power station, the Menaida Tigers, was originally known by the name "Linkbelt."

There is no grass growing in the stadium; the playing surface is comprised completely of phosphate dust and dirt.  The motto of the NAFA is "the hard men of football".

Gallery

See also
Australian rules football in Nauru

References

External links
Linkbelt Oval at Google Maps

Australian rules football grounds
Sports venues in Nauru
Nauru
Soccer venues in Nauru
Australian rules football in Nauru